Lists of medical abbreviations